Berceo is a municipality in La Rioja, Spain.  It is located near the monastery of San Millán de la Cogolla and was the birthplace of Gonzalo de Berceo. It has also been proposed as identification of historic Vergegio, named by Braulio of Zaragoza as the birthplace of Saint Millán, although present Berdejo in Aragon is another candidate.

References 

Municipalities in La Rioja (Spain)